The Hartley-Rose Belting Company Building in Pittsburgh, Pennsylvania, is a building from 1906. It was listed on the National Register of Historic Places in 1983.

References

Commercial buildings on the National Register of Historic Places in Pennsylvania
Beaux-Arts architecture in Pennsylvania
Commercial buildings completed in 1906
Commercial buildings in Pittsburgh
Pittsburgh History & Landmarks Foundation Historic Landmarks
National Register of Historic Places in Pittsburgh
1906 establishments in Pennsylvania